Yunus Badat (born 1943, Northern Rhodesia) was a Zambian cricketer. He played two One day Internationals representing East Africa in the 1975 World Cup. He scored only one run in all and did not bowl in any of the match.

External links
Badat Cricinfo Profile
 Yunus Badat Profile at Official ZambiaCricket.Org

1943 births
Living people
East African cricketers
East Africa One Day International cricketers
Zambian cricketers
Cricketers at the 1975 Cricket World Cup